Micropleura may refer to:
 Micropleura (nematode), a genus of nematodes in the family Micropleuridae
 Micropleura (plant), a genus of plants in the family Apiaceae